The Necklace of the Stars (Portuguese: Colar das Estrelas) is a diamond necklace originally made for Queen Consort Maria Pia of Savoy. It is a piece of the Portuguese Crown Jewels.

History 
The Necklace of the Stars was made in 1865 for the wife of King Luís I of Portugal, Queen Consort Maria Pia of Savoy, who had a love for jewelry and fashion. The necklace was fashioned in the workshop of the Portuguese Royal Jeweler in Lisbon, Portugal. The necklace is just a piece of a whole set of jewelry that was commissioned by Maria Pia, which includes the famed Diadem of the Stars, the counterpart of the necklace.

Details 
It is fashioned out of gold and colourless and pink diamonds.

See also 
Diadem of the Stars
Portuguese Crown Jewels

Sources 

Portuguese Crown Jewels
Portuguese monarchy
Individual necklaces